The Radio 1 Roadshow was an annual summer event hosted and broadcast by BBC Radio 1 from the 1970s through to the 1990s.   The roadshow enjoyed three decades of live broadcasts from beach resorts around the UK.  The curtain was brought down on the summer roadshows on July and August 1999, when the BBC replaced them with a series of one-day pop festivals in cities around the UK.

History 
The concept for the Roadshow came from Radio 1 producer and later controller, Johnny Beerling and was envisaged and purchased by Tony Miles, built and maintained by John Dean, with engineers Peter Lucken and Johnny Heritage. The first Roadshow was held at Newquay, Cornwall, on Monday 23 July 1973, and was hosted by Alan Freeman.

Various disc jockeys from the station would visit British towns, usually on the coast, to play a live set, meet local people to play their requests, take part in games and give away "goodie bags" of Radio 1 gifts. Accompanying the DJs were the support crew, led by Tony Miles, nicknamed "Smiley Miley", who had provided the original caravan for the first Roadshow.

Several games were devised especially for participation in by the live audience. Most notable were two that ran throughout the Roadshow's history, 'Bits and Pieces' and 'Smiley Miley's Mileage Game'. In the former, contestants selected from the Roadshow crowd had to name a series of pop hits after hearing a tape containing a dozen or so brief excerpts, the winner being the one who accurately identified the most. In the latter, gamers had to assess how many miles the Roadshow truck had travelled from the previous venue, the one making the most accurate guess being deemed the victor.

The typical roadshow summer season started in July and ran for eight weeks, broadcasting live on Radio 1 from the roadshow locations from 11am to 12.30pm each weekday. The first hour from 10am was a warm-up ahead of the 11am start of the live broadcast. By the late 70's they became a key part of the summer schedules for Radio 1, and attracted much support during their run.

The largest attendance was at Sutton Park, Birmingham, on Sunday 30 August 1992, when 100,000 fans turned up to celebrate the 25th anniversary of Radio 1 with live performances from bands including Del Amitri, Aswad, The Farm and Status Quo.

In the early 1990s several attempts were made to modernise the Roadshow. Under Matthew Bannister, for example, in 1993 and 1994, the station commissioned an independent production company to make an audio postcard for each venue in advance of the Roadshow's arrival in that place. 36 whistle-stop "2 Minute Tours" were made each year, and broadcast several times in the 24 hours leading up to the Roadshow proper, in order to give a wider reflection of life in each place.

By the mid-1990s the Roadshow had expanded to 54 live dates over 9 weeks. Two trucks reversed back-to-back to form a 75-foot stage front. Chris Hopkins was one of the last warm up DJ's on the roadshows replacing Smiley Miley

Demise 
The final old-style Roadshow was held at Marine Parade, Brighton with Chris Moyles in 1999. As part of reforms to the station, the Radio 1 Roadshow was axed in favour of a series of one-day pop concerts, called One Big Sunday. These have now been replaced by a single two-day event called BBC Radio 1's Big Weekend. The style of the event is more akin to a standalone music festival than the broadcasting-based shows of old. The emphasis is on current artists and new music.

Since the Radio 1 Roadshow's demise, some of the crew that were behind the roadshow's success have subsequently purchased some of the old roadshow vehicles, and are using them as stages for many local radio station roadshows.

Roadshow vehicles 
There were 4 Roadshow vehicles over the history of the programme:

 Mark I (1974–1975) – This was essentially a caravan with a drop-down stage.
 Mark II (1976–1981) – This was the first articulated, trailer-mounted vehicle, with a fold-down stage and 2 off-stage areas for technical gear and hospitality. At the end of its Radio 1 life, it became the “Delivery Van” for Saturday Superstore on BBC TV, acting essentially as a Roadshow style element for the Saturday morning children’s show.
 Mark III (1982–1989) – As the popularity of the Roadshow increased, a new articulated trailer with a higher and larger stage, plus roof area, was procured by Radio 1. This also offered a larger audio control room and office space for the production team. When it was withdrawn from Radio 1 use, it was re-branded and used by Radio 2, before being sold by the BBC.
 Up until 1989 support vehicles were being used in the form of 7.5 & 12.5 ton trucks, these carried most of the audio equipment of which by this date had grown to massive proportions, these trucks were multipurpose vehicles that could themselves be folded out into separate stage areas, as well as host the crew John Dean, Peter Lucken, "Froggy" John Heritage who provided the engineering and Sound system for the roadshow up until the BBC took over. Two of these trucks are owned by PLRS Sound System & Stage Hire and are continuing to be hired out as stage units, and as PA system haulage vehicles on a regular basis
 Mark IV (1990–1999) – At the start of the 1990s, a new Roadshow facility was required, with the ability to cater for further live performances and bigger crowds. The new facility consisted of a main vehicle with the core audio facilities and stage, plus a second vehicle that backed up onto the main vehicle, providing office and green room facilities for guests. Special PA lifts were installed to allow the speakers for the PA system to be easily lifted up to the roof. In 2003 it was purchased by Totally Sound Ltd. On the eve of the 45th anniversary of the very first roadshow, Tony Miles announced he had purchased both Mark IV units and would be restoring them to their former glory.

References  	 

BBC Radio 1
Annual events in the United Kingdom
1973 establishments in the United Kingdom
1999 disestablishments in the United Kingdom
Music festivals established in 1973
Recurring events disestablished in 1999
BBC Radio in Concert